Thandiswa Linnen Marawu is a South African politician from the African Transformation Movement. She has sat in the National Assembly of South Africa since 2019.

References

Living people
African Transformation Movement politicians
Members of the Eastern Cape Provincial Legislature
Members of the National Assembly of South Africa
Women members of the National Assembly of South Africa
21st-century South African women politicians
21st-century South African politicians
Year of birth missing (living people)
Place of birth missing (living people)